The International Falls–Fort Frances Border Crossing connects the cities of International Falls, Minnesota and Fort Frances, Ontario, at the Fort Frances–International Falls International Bridge.

The US port of entry was established in 1895, when the city of International Falls and its post office were established.  However, significant cross-border traffic didn't occur until after the dam across the Rainy River was completed in 1905.  In 1912, the Fort Frances–International Falls International Bridge was completed.  It was built by the Minnesota and Ontario Paper Company, and featured a railroad track and two vehicular lanes.  Cars and trucks must cross the tracks at grade on both ends of the bridge.

See also
 List of Canada–United States border crossings

References 

Canada–United States border crossings
1895 establishments in Minnesota
1895 establishments in Ontario
International Falls, Minnesota
Fort Frances
Buildings and structures in Koochiching County, Minnesota